Manchester is a city in Northwest England.  Most of the M25 postcode area is in the town of Bury, but part of it is in the Manchester district of the city.  This part of the postcode area contains eight listed buildings that are recorded in the National Heritage List for England.  Of these, one is listed at Grade I, the highest of the three grades, three are at Grade II*, the middle grade, and the others are at Grade II, the lowest grade.  All the buildings are in Heaton Park.


Key

Buildings

References

Citations

Sources

Lists of listed buildings in Greater Manchester
Buildings and structures in Manchester